Sogatella is a genus of delphacid planthoppers in the family Delphacidae. There are more than 20 described species in Sogatella.

Species
These 21 species belong to the genus Sogatella:

 Sogatella albofimbriata (Muir, 1926)
 Sogatella camptistylis Fennah, 1963
 Sogatella capensis (Muir, 1929)
 Sogatella colorata (Motschulsky, 1863)
 Sogatella eupompe Kirkaldy, 1907
 Sogatella furcifera (Horváth, 1899), SE Asia rice pest. Genome:
 Sogatella gemina Fennah, 1963
 Sogatella geranor (Kirkaldy, 1907)
 Sogatella kolophon (Kirkaldy, 1907)
 Sogatella krugeri (Muir, 1929)
 Sogatella manetho Fennah, 1963
 Sogatella molina (Fennah, 1963)
 Sogatella nigeriensis (Muir, 1920)
 Sogatella nigrigenis (Jacobi, 1917)
 Sogatella panicicola (Ishihara, 1949)
 Sogatella petax Fennah, 1963
 Sogatella subana (Crawford, 1914)
 Sogatella timaea Fennah, 1969
 Sogatella unidentata Mariani & Remes Lenicov, 2017
 Sogatella vibix (Haupt, 1927)
 Sogatella yei Linnavuori, 1973

References

Further reading

External links

 

Articles created by Qbugbot
Auchenorrhyncha genera
Delphacini